Sudarsan Pattnaik (born 15 April 1977) is an Indian sand artist from Puri, Odisha. In 2014, the Government of India honoured him with the Padma Shri, India's fourth-highest civilian award, for his seashore sand arts.

Early life and background
Sudarsan Pattnaik was born in a poor family in Marchikote Lane, Puri district, Odisha, in 1977. In February 2017, he broke the Guinness world record for making the world's largest sand castle, which was located on Puri Beach, Odisha. His record was broken by Skulptura Projects GmbH in Binz, Germany, in June 2019.

International awards and achievements

Italy: First Indian to win the Italian Sand Art Award, 2019, at the International Scorrano Sand Nativity event held in Lecce, Italy from 13 to 17 November.

Awards and achievements
 He was awarded Padma Shri by Government of India, the Fourth Highest Civilian Award in India, in 2014 for his contribution in Sand Arts.
 People's Choice Award at Sand Sculpting World Cup 2014 at Atlantic City, US.

References

External links
 Website Dedicated to Mr. Patnaik's work
  An OrissaDiary Interview with Mr. Sudarsan Patnaik
 International Sand Art by Sudarsan Patnaik (Puri District Website)
 Telegraph (UK) Sand sculptures by Sudarsan Pattnaik from India
 Sand Art Image of Gaddafi in Reuter Story
  Sudarsan Pattnaik's sand sculpture on global warming wins Berlin contest
 Youth projects ideas through sand ar
 Sand artist Sudarshan Pattnaik's sand art images
 Pattnaik creates sand sculpture to popularize Earth Hour (Sify News)
 Unique 'get well soon' wish for Big B (The Times of India)
 A sand sculpture of Amitabh Bachchan (apunkachoice.com)
 Sculptor builds his 38th Taj Mahal in Amsterdam (Sindh Today)

1977 births
Living people
Indian male sculptors
21st-century Indian sculptors
People from Puri
Recipients of the Padma Shri in arts
21st-century Indian male artists